Lyubomir Lyubenov may refer to:

Lyubomir Lubenov (born 1980), Bulgarian footballer
Lyubomir Lyubenov (canoeist) (born 1957), Bulgarian Olympic flatwater canoeist